Butterley is a village in the English county of Derbyshire near to Ripley. It is the site of the Midland Railway – Butterley, as well as the old Butterley Brickworks.

Notable residents 
Sir James Outram, hero of the Indian Mutiny, was born at Butterley Hall in 1803.
Harry Storer Sr., goalkeeper for Arsenal F.C. and Liverpool F.C., was born here in 1870.
William Storer, professional cricketer for Derbyshire, was born here in 1867.

See also 
Butterley Company
Butterley Hall
Butterley Tunnel
Listed buildings in Ripley, Derbyshire

References

External links
 

Villages in Derbyshire
Geography of Amber Valley